IL32 or IL-32 may be:

 Ilyushin Il-32, a Cold War-era Soviet heavy glider
 Interleukin 32, a proinflammatory cytokine
 Illinois Route 32, a state highway in Illinois